Actin-binding Rho-activating protein is a protein that in humans is encoded by the ABRA gene. The mouse and rat homologues are known as STARS (striated muscle activator of Rho signalling) and MS1 (myocyte stress 1) respectively.

MS1/STARS is regulated by MyoD during myogenic differentiation of the C2C12 cell line.

References

External links

Further reading